Alexander Díaz (born 22 March 2000) is an Argentine professional footballer who plays as a forward for Ferro on loan from San Lorenzo.

Club career
Díaz began his youth career with Once Tigres in 2007, remaining in their system until 2015 when he was moved into their first-team; subsequently featuring in Torneo Federal B. Later that year, San Lorenzo signed Díaz. His professional debut arrived three years later on 7 September 2018, with the midfielder being substituted on for the final seconds of a Copa Argentina match with Colón. Just over a week later, on 16 September, Díaz made his Argentine Primera División bow against Godoy Cruz. He scored his first senior goal on 14 November 2020 against Aldosivi in the Copa de la Liga Profesional.

On 25 January 2022, Díaz was loaned out to Arsenal de Sarandí until the end of the year.

International career
In August 2018, Díaz was called up to play for the Argentina U20s. His first cap came on 29 August in a friendly with Uruguay.

Career statistics
.

Notes

References

External links

2000 births
Living people
Sportspeople from Buenos Aires Province
Argentine footballers
Argentina youth international footballers
Argentina under-20 international footballers
Association football forwards
Argentine Primera División players
San Lorenzo de Almagro footballers
Arsenal de Sarandí footballers